The Tigre people ( tigre or  tigrē) are an ethnic group indigenous to Eritrea. They mainly inhabit the lowlands and northern highlands of Eritrea.

History
The Tigre are a nomadic agro-pastoralist community living in the northern, western, and coastal highlands of Eritrea (Gash-Barka, Anseba, Northern Red Sea regions of Eritrea and other regions too), as well as areas in eastern Sudan. The Tigre speak the Tigre language, which belongs to the Semitic branch of the Afroasiatic family. They are not ethnically homogeneous; diversity is mainly along familial and clan lines. The Tigre ethnic group is broken into the Beni-Amer, Beit Asgede, Ad Shaikh, Mensa, Beit Juk, and Marya peoples.

The original speakers of the Tigre language were mainly Christian, reflecting cultural exchange with neighboring Ethiopia. The first Tigre converts to Islam were those who lived on islands in the Red Sea and adopted Islam in the 7th century during the religion's earliest years. Mainland Tigre adopted Islam much later on including as late as the 19th century. During World War II, many Tigre served in the Italian Colonial army, part of the period of Italian Eritrea.

The Tigre are closely related to the Biher Tigrinya of Eritrea, as well as the Beja (particularly the Hadendoa). There are also a number of Eritreans of Tigre origin living across the Middle East, North America, the United Kingdom and Australia.

Religion

About 95% of Tigre practice Islam, the remainder practice Christianity, and both incorporate elements of the animist folk religion. Religious divisions have not been of particular concern within the Tigre. Most are Sunni Muslims, but there are a small number of Christians
(who are members of the Eritrean Orthodox Tewahedo Church, the Roman Catholic Church, and the Evangelical Lutheran Church of Eritrea) among them as well (often referred to as the Mensaï in Eritrea).

Language
The Tigre language is an Afroasiatic language of the Semitic branch. Like Tigrinya, it is a member of the Ethiopian Semitic group, and is similar to ancient Ge'ez. There is no known historically written form of the language. The Eritrean government uses the Ge'ez writing system (an abugida) to publish documents in the Tigre language.

Tigre is the lingua franca of the multi-ethnic lowlands of western and northern Eritrea, including the northern coast. As such approximately 75% of the Western Lowlands Eritrean population speaks Tigre.

Since around 1889, the Ge'ez script (Ethiopic script) has been used to write the Tigre language. Tigre speakers formerly used Arabic more widely as a lingua franca. Due to most Tigre speakers being Muslim, the language is also written in the Arabic alphabet.

The Tigre people, language and their area of inhabitation should not be confused with that of the Tigrayans, who live in northern Ethiopia and the Biher-Tigrinya who live in the central Eritrean highlands, both of which speak varying dialects of Tigrinya, a closely related Semitic language.

Dialects
There are several dialects of Tigre, some of them are; Mansa’ (Mensa), Habab, Barka, Semhar, Algeden, Senhit (Ad-Tekleis, Ad-Temariam, Bet-Juk, Marya Kayah, Maria Tselam) and Dahalik, which is spoken in Dahlak archipelago. Intelligibility between the dialects is above 91% (except Dahalik), where intelligibility between Dahalik and the other dialects is between 24% to 51%.

Notable Tigre people
Ibrahim Sultan
Hamid Idris Awate
Ali Radai
Hamid Ferej

References

Notes

References

Further reading

Ethnic groups in Sudan
Ethnic groups in Eritrea
Eritrea–Sudan relations